Never Boring is a box set compilation of solo work by English musician Freddie Mercury, released on 11 October 2019. The box set contains three CDs and a collection of promotional videos on both Blu-ray and DVD, as well as a 120-page hardbound book. All three discs were also issued individually on CD, vinyl, digital and streaming services.

Track listing

Never Boring (12-track compilation)

Mr. Bad Guy (2019 special edition)

Barcelona (2012 orchestral edition)

Never Boring (Blu-ray / DVD)

Charts

References

2019 compilation albums
Freddie Mercury albums
Compilation albums published posthumously
Mercury Records compilation albums
Hollywood Records compilation albums